Thompson is a rural municipality in the Pembina Valley Region of Manitoba, Canada. It had a population of 1,259 according to the Canada 2006 Census.

The RM was incorporated on 1 November 1908. It took its name from an early settler and its first postmaster, William Thompson. Thompson homesteaded on 5-5-6W in about 1874 and his home was central to the early community. The area was known locally as Thompsonville at that time.

Communities
Deerwood
Miami - The main village in Thompson.
Rosebank

Demographics 

References 

 Manitoba Municipalities: Rural Municipality of Thompson
 Geographic Names of Manitoba (pg. 273) - the Millennium Bureau of Canada
 Thompson RM, MB Community Profile
 Map of Thompson R.M. at Statcan

Thompson